Dagmar Stupp (married Volke, born ?) is a German former canoeist who won at senior level the Wildwater Canoeing World Championships.

References

External links
 Dagmar Stupp at Sportlerbiographien

Possibly living people
Year of birth missing (living people)
German female canoeists
Place of birth missing (living people)